"Friends" is a song written by English musician Elton John and songwriter Bernie Taupin, and performed by John. It was John's third U.S. hit, and his second to reach Top 40 after the breakthrough success of "Your Song".

The song rose to number 34 on the U.S. Billboard Hot 100 and number 17 on the Cash Box Top 100. On the Canadian singles chart "Friends" peaked at number 13.  "Friends" also became a medium hit on the Adult Contemporary charts of both nations.

Background
"Friends" was not the follow-up single to "Your Song," but was rather the title track and theme song from the movie Friends starring Sean Bury, and was included on the soundtrack.  It was the only hit single from the LP. The most recent performance of "Friends" was in 1999.

Cash Box described the song as lacking "the effortless commercial magnetism of 'Your Song.'"

Chart performance

References

External links
 

1971 singles
1971 songs
Songs with lyrics by Bernie Taupin
Songs with music by Elton John
Elton John songs
Uni Records singles
Song recordings produced by Gus Dudgeon
Songs about friendship